Isaako is both a given name and surname. Notable people with the name include:

Isaako Aaitui (born 1987), American football nose tackle
Jamayne Isaako (born 1996), New Zealand rugby league player
Patuki Isaako, Tokelauan political figure

Surnames of Oceanian origin